Nox were a Hungarian pop band which mixed traditional Hungarian music with more modern sounds. They released 7 albums and had two fixed members, Szilvia Péter Szabó, and Tamás Nagy.

Eurovision performance
They are best known in the rest of Europe for representing Hungary in the Eurovision Song Contest 2005 in Kyiv. After qualifying from the semi-final in fifth place, they eventually finished 12th with their song Forogj, világ! (Spin, World). They were the first Hungarian act in the contest since 1998.

Discography

Albums

See also
Hungarian pop

External links
 Nox Official Website (Hungarian language)
 The Official Myspace of NOX
 Hej Dunáról video

Hungarian pop music groups
Eurovision Song Contest entrants for Hungary
Eurovision Song Contest entrants of 2005